NGC 1234 is a peculiar barred spiral galaxy exhibiting a ring structure in the constellation Eridanus, discovered by Francis Preserved Leavenworth in 1886.

References

External links
 
 Digitized Sky Survey - NG 1234 photo
 

1234
Eridanus (constellation)
Barred spiral galaxies
011813